Dreams & Chaos is a novel by Sentilong Ozüküm. It is his second solo novel, and his third book overall. It was published on 19 October 2020. It tells the story of Moluti Jamir,  in the journey of the growing pains of adulthood, of expectations unrealised, of learning how to let go and moving on, of a love lost and found and, of second chances.

A Naga web series adaptation of the same name as novel directed by Bendang Walling, Waluniba Ajem and Limasenla Jamir was released on 13 November 2020. The series went on to win the Best Web Series at the 2021 KIIFF Awards.

References

2020 Indian novels